Cape Møsting is a headland in the North Atlantic Ocean, southeast Greenland, Kujalleq municipality.

History
Cape Møsting was named by Lieutenant Wilhelm August Graah in 1829 during his East Coast expedition. Graah took a latitude observation at the headland and named it after Johan Sigismund von Møsting.

One of the umiak women rowers of Graah's party gave birth to twins at the cape. The Inuit babies died shortly after delivery and were buried in a cleft of the rocks of the two small islands off the SW side of Cape Møsting. Graah named these islands "Tvillingøen", Twin Islands, after the dead twins.

Geography
Cape Møsting is located at the southeastern end of Odinland. It is a steep and prominent headland on the northern side of the mouth of Bernstorff Fjord. Usually great masses of icebergs lie near the fjord entrance to the south of the cape making navigation along the shore difficult. Dangerous eddies and whirlpools form within the bank of icebergs as powerful currents flow out of the fjord. Tvillingøen, two small islands rise near the cape.

Further north rise the icy cliffs of the Kangerajiip Apusiia (Colberger Heide) tidewater glacier.

References

External links
 Seabirds and seals in Southeast Greenland

Møsting
Odinland